The 2004 Russian Figure Skating Championships took place in Saint Petersburg from January 5 to 8, 2004. Skaters competed in the disciplines of men's singles, ladies' singles, pair skating, and ice dancing. The results were one of the criteria used to pick the Russian teams to the 2004 World Championships and the 2004 European Championships.

Senior results

Men

Ladies

Pairs

Ice dancing

External links
 results

2003 in figure skating
Russian Figure Skating Championships, 2004
Figure skating
Russian Figure Skating Championships